Baldissero d'Alba is a comune (municipality) in the Province of Cuneo in the Italian region Piedmont, located about  southeast of Turin and about  northeast of Cuneo.

Baldissero d'Alba borders the following municipalities: Ceresole Alba, Corneliano d'Alba, Montaldo Roero, Sommariva del Bosco, and Sommariva Perno.

Main sights 
 The Colonna Castlem including a frescoed Gothic chapel
 Parish Church of St. Catherine
 Church of Sant'Antonino

Demographic evolution

References 

Cities and towns in Piedmont
Roero